A State of Trance 2009 is the sixth compilation album in the A State of Trance compilation series mixed and compiled by Dutch DJ and record producer Armin van Buuren. The tWO-disc album was released on 8 June 2009 by Armada Music.

Track listing

Charts

References

Armin van Buuren compilation albums
Electronic compilation albums
2009 compilation albums